Ernst Robert Efraim Fast (21 January 1881 in Stockholm – 26 October 1959 in Sigtuna) was Swedish long distance runner who competed in the late 19th century and early 20th century. He specialized in the marathon and participated in the event in Athletics at the 1900 Summer Olympics in Paris and won the bronze medal, behind second place Émile Champion.

References

External links

1881 births
1959 deaths
Athletes from Stockholm
Swedish male long-distance runners
Swedish male marathon runners
Olympic bronze medalists for Sweden
Olympic athletes of Sweden
Athletes (track and field) at the 1900 Summer Olympics
Medalists at the 1900 Summer Olympics
Olympic bronze medalists in athletics (track and field)